Kim Gwang Seok is a Korean Greco-Roman Wrestler. He won gold medal at 2006 Asian Games at Doha in 120 kg match.

References

Living people
Place of birth missing (living people)
Year of birth missing (living people)
Asian Games medalists in wrestling
Wrestlers at the 2006 Asian Games
Wrestlers at the 2010 Asian Games
South Korean male sport wrestlers
Asian Games gold medalists for South Korea
Medalists at the 2006 Asian Games
21st-century South Korean people